Alizarin Red S (also known as C.I. Mordant Red 3, Alizarin Carmine, and C.I 58005.) is a water-soluble sodium salt of Alizarin sulfonic acid with a chemical formula of . Alizarin Red S was discovered by Graebe and Libermann in 1871. In the field of histology alizarin Red S is used to stain calcium deposits in tissues, and in geology to stain and differentiate carbonate minerals.

Uses

Alizarin Red S is used in histology and histopathology to stain, or locate calcium deposits in tissues. In the presence of calcium, Alizarin Red S, binds to the calcium to form a Lake pigment that is orange to red in color. Whole specimens can be stained with Alizarin Red S to show the distribution of bone, especially in developing embryos. In living corals alizarin Red S has been used to mark daily growth layers. 

In geology, Alizarin Red S is used on Thin sections, and polished surfaces to help identify carbonate minerals which stain at different rates.

See also
 Aniline
 1,2,4-Trihydroxyanthraquinone or purpurin, another red dye that occurs in madder root
 Hydroxyanthraquinone
 Dihydroxyanthraquinone
 List of dyes
 List of colors (compact)

References

Anthraquinone dyes
Catechols
Chelating agents
Dihydroxyanthraquinones
Organic pigments
Natural dyes
Staining dyes
Histology
Histotechnology
Staining
Histochemistry